Faten is a given name. Notable people with the name include:

Faten al Murr, also known as Fatin al-Murr, (Arabic: فاتن المرّ) (born 1969), Lebanese academic and writer
Faten Hamama (born 1932), Egyptian producer and an acclaimed actress of film, television, and theatre
Faten Mahmoud, Minister of State for Women's Affairs in the cabinet of Iraqi Prime Minister Nouri al-Maliki
Faten Yahiaoui (born 1985), Tunisian team handball player
Faten Zahran Mohammed (born 1955), Egyptian biochemist and environmental biologist, Cancer Biologist and Toxicologist

See also

Fadden (disambiguation)
Faethon
Faeton
Fate
Fatema
Fatenah
Fat Hen (disambiguation)
Fatima (disambiguation)
Fatine
Fat Man (disambiguation)
Patton (disambiguation)
Vatten (disambiguation)